William Vandeveer Myers (October 31, 1886 – death date unknown) was an American Negro league catcher between 1908 and 1921.

A native of Brooklyn, New York, Myers made his Negro leagues debut in 1908 with the Brooklyn Royal Giants. He played for Brooklyn again in 1910, and went on to play for the Cleveland Tate Stars in 1921.

References

External links
Baseball statistics and player information from Baseball-Reference Black Baseball Stats and Seamheads

1886 births
Year of death missing
Place of death missing
Brooklyn Royal Giants players
Cleveland Tate Stars players
Baseball catchers
Baseball players from New York (state)
Sportspeople from Brooklyn
Baseball players from New York City